Farrer Park United is a now-defunct soccer club from Singapore. The team won Singapore's National Football League in 1982, and the President's Cup in 1981 and 1983.

The club played at the Farrer Park Field as their home stadium.

History 
In 1976, Farrer Park United lost to Geylang International, 2-0, in the finals of the Toto League Cup.

In 1979, Robert Ng and Robert Lim joined the club as manager and coach.

In 1982, Farrer Park United won the National Football League Division 1 and also the national U15 title.

In 1983, Dutch goalkeeper, Alex Brouwer, formerly from PSV Eindhoven join the club.

In 1983, the club won the President's Cup with a 3-0 win over Singapore Armed Forces Sports Association.

Players 
The club also had the only British player, Chris Bates, playing in the National Football League.

The team had also many other Singaporean national football players, such as Malek Awab, Norhalis Shafik, Marzuki Elias and Razali Rashid.

References

Football clubs in Singapore